Don Amalio Gimeno y Cabañas (31 May 1852, in Cartagena, Spain – 13 September 1936, in Madrid) was a Spanish nobleman, physician, scientist and politician who served as Minister of Estate, Minister of Gobernación and Minister of Marine of Spain.

Counts of Spain
Foreign ministers of Spain
1852 births
1936 deaths
Liberal Party (Spain, 1880) politicians
People from Cartagena, Spain
Politicians from Cartagena, Spain
Interior ministers of Spain